Robert A. Cowan (born c. 1947) is a Scottish curler, journalist, curling historian, blogger.

At the national level, he is a 1983 Scottish men's champion curler.

He is the co-founder of The Curling History Blog (co-founded in 2008 with David B. Smith), one of the main sources about curling history (mainly in Scotland, the United Kingdom, and Europe). He is the author of several books about curling history.

At the time of the 1983 World Championships he was a part-time sports writer for the Glasgow Herald and a lecturer in clinical biochemistry at the University of Glasgow.

Teams

Men's

Mixed

References

Further reading
 Curling and the Silver Broom: the story of the World Curling Championship (1985). Bob Cowan, 174 pages,

External links
 

Living people
Scottish male curlers
Scottish curling champions
Scottish sportswriters
Scottish bloggers
21st-century Scottish historians
1940s births
People associated with the University of Glasgow
The Herald (Glasgow) people
Place of birth missing (living people)